Paul Gouin (May 20, 1898 – December 4, 1976) was a politician in Quebec, Canada, was the son of Lomer Gouin and the grandson of Honoré Mercier.

Life and career
He was born in Montreal, Quebec to Lomer Gouin and Éliza Mercier. He fought in World War I as a tank commander, studied at Université Laval, and was admitted to the bar of Quebec in 1920.

Dissatisfied with the direction of the Quebec Liberal Party, he helped found the Action libérale nationale party on June 6, 1934. He soon formed an alliance with Maurice Duplessis's Quebec Conservative Party to contest the 1935 provincial election.  Gouin withdrew his support from Duplessis on June 18, 1936, but most members of the ALN caucus sided with Duplessis and joined with his Conservative caucus, which formally merged into the Union Nationale party, which not long afterwards won the 1936 election.

He re-formed the Action libérale nationale and became its leader on July 24, 1938. However, the ALN did poorly in the 1939 election, winning only 4.5% of the popular vote and no seats, and soon disbanded. He helped found the Bloc populaire canadien in 1942 but left it in early 1944 when André Laurendeau was chosen to lead the Quebec wing of the party. In 1952 he succeeded Madame Athanase David as the President of the Montreal Festivals, a post he held through 1956.

See also
 Politics of Quebec
 Quebec general elections
 Timeline of Quebec history

External links
 

1898 births
1976 deaths
Action libérale nationale MNAs
Politicians from Montreal
Quebec political party leaders
Université Laval alumni